Mariano Grondona (born 19 October 1932, in Buenos Aires) is an Argentine lawyer, sociologist, political scientist, essayist and commentator. He has been a journalist for several decades, appearing in print media and on television, and has written several books. He has also taught in several universities, both in Argentina and abroad.

As an academic
Grondona studied Law and Social Sciences at the University of Buenos Aires (UBA). He did postgraduate studies on Sociology at the University of Madrid, and on Political Science at the Political Studies Institute of Madrid. Since 1984 he has been a professor of Political Law at UBA.

Media career
Mr. Grondona for many years wrote for and ,in its last years, directed the most important post war hemispheric magazine, Visión:La Revista Latinoamericana, between 1978 and 1995. He was the international news writer for the daily newspaper La Nación between 1987 and 1996, and later become a political op-ed writer in the same newspaper, a position he still holds .

Since 1989, he hosts his own weekly TV program.

In 1997 he received the Platinum- and Diamond Konex Award for Communication-Journalism, and have been awarded the Konnex Merit Diploma on the field of Political Analysis in 1987.

During the 2000s he has hosted two radio shows, Las claves del día and Pensando con Mariano Grondona.

Political standing
Grondona's views are considered right wing, with a strong Catholic element (as opposed to the more liberal -but still conservative- ideology of other right-wing opinion leaders such as the late Álvaro Alsogaray). In matters of Argentine foreign policy, he favors alignment with the United States.

In the mid-1960s, Grondona supported the coup that brought dictator Juan Carlos Onganía to the presidency, and later held public office in his government, although he grew disappointed and was later dismissed. He stated that he "had tried to make a De Gaulle of Onganía, and got a Franco instead".

In the 1970s Grondona was a supporter of presidents Héctor José Cámpora and Juan Perón. After Perón's death during his term, Grondona supported the policies of Isabel Perón's Welfare Minister José López Rega, founder of the Argentine Anti-Communist Alliance.

As Isabel Perón's government fell apart, he advocated the participation of the military, and welcomed the beginning of the National Reorganization Process in 1976. A non-authorized biography of Grondona, El Doctor, by Martín Sivak (2005), pointed out that he worked as an advisor of military junta member Brigadier Basilio Lami Dozo, on whose request he wrote a government programme titled Bases Políticas para la Reorganización Nacional (echoing Juan Bautista Alberdi's Bases and Points of Departure for the Political Organization of the Argentine Republic).

In his program "Hora Clave" on March 16, 2003, he declared about the dictatorship in Argentina from 1976 to 1983 that "The rational behavior, in any war, is to be on the side of the winners". On the day of former Chilean dictator Augusto Pinochet's death, he declared in the same program that "If Allende had stayed in power, Chile would have probably become a communist country", as well as "I can understand that someone that has a fascist ideology, will try to live by what he considers his "principles" [...], but what really disappointed me is the fact that he had bank accounts in Switzerland. That is intolerable".

Bibliography
 Política y Gobierno, Buenos Aires, Columba, 1962.
 La Argentina en el Tiempo y el Mundo, Buenos Aires, Sudamericana, 1967.
 Los Dos Poderes, Buenos Aires, Emecé, 1973.
 La Construcción de la Democracia, Buenos Aires, Eudeba, 1973.
 Los Pensadores de la Libertad, Sudamericana, 1986.
 Bajo el imperio de las Ideas Morales, Buenos Aires, Sudamericana, 1988.
 Values and Development, Harvard University, Source Book, 1988.
 Toward a Theory of Development, Harvard University, Author's Workshop, 1990.
 El posliberalismo, Buenos Aires, Planeta, 1992.
 La corrupción, Buenos Aires, Planeta, 1994.
 La Argentina como vocación, Buenos Aires, Planeta, 1994.
 El mundo en clave, Buenos Aires, Planeta, 1996.
 Las condiciones culturales del desarrollo económico, Buenos Aires, Planeta, 1999.
 La realidad, Buenos Aires, Planeta, 2001.
 Estepas de una noche agitada, Buenos Aires, Planeta, 2016.

References

Argentine sociologists
Argentine television personalities
Argentine Roman Catholics
People from Buenos Aires
Argentine people of Italian descent
1932 births
Living people
Argentine anti-communists
Academic staff of the University of Buenos Aires